National Highway 330A, commonly referred to as NH 330A is a national highway in  India. It is a spur road of National Highway 30. NH-330A traverses the state of Uttar Pradesh in India.

NH 330A is a 4 Lane highway in UP.

Toll(Toll Plza or Toll Tex)
 Milkipur

See also
 List of National Highways in India by highway number
 National Highways Development Project

References

External links 

 NH 330A on OpenStreetMap

National highways in India
National Highways in Uttar Pradesh
Transport in Ayodhya